Zuheir Mohsen (1936 – 25 July 1979) was a Palestinian leader of the pro-Syria As-Sa'iqa Ba'athist faction of the Palestine Liberation Organization (PLO) between 1971 and 1979. 

Previously active in the Jordanian wing of the Ba'ath Party, he was chosen for this position after defense minister Hafez al-Assad's 1969–70 takeover in Syria, which he had supported against the previously dominant government of Salah Jadid. Mohsen was also a member of the National Command of the Ba'ath Party.

Early life
Mohsen was born in Tulkarm, Mandatory Palestine, now in the northern West Bank, where his father was the mukhtar (head of the town). He became involved in political activity at a young age, joining the Ba'ath party at the age of 17. Mohsen trained as a teacher but lost his job in 1957 after being arrested for "subversive activity". He subsequently spent time in Qatar, from where he was eventually deported as a result of his political activity, before making his way to Damascus where he helped form as-Sa'iqa.

Mohsen rose to the position of heading as-Sa'iqa thanks to his close links to Assad, who after taking power in Syria purged the movement of its leftist elements (bringing it ideologically closer to Fatah) and appointed Mohsen as its General Secretary.

Political views
Mohsen essentially followed the line of as-Sa'iqa's Syrian Ba'athist ideology, which interpreted the Palestinian question through a perspective of pan-Arab nationalism. In some respects this contravened the PLO charter, which affirmed the existence of a future Palestinian State. 

Mohsen himself stated that there were "no differences between Jordanians, Palestinians, Syrians, and Lebanese", though Palestinian identity would be emphasised for political reasons. In a March 1977 interview with the Dutch newspaper Trouw he stated that "between Jordanians, Palestinians, Syrians and Lebanese there are no differences. We are all part of one people, the Arab nation [...] Just for political reasons we carefully underwrite our Palestinian identity. Because it is of national interest for the Arabs to advocate the existence of Palestinians to balance Zionism. Yes, the existence of a separate Palestinian identity exists only for tactical reasons" , representing the Ba'athist perceptive regarding the question of Palestine.

Journalist Robert Fisk claimed that As-Saiqa, under Mohsen, employed its energies against the PLO stating that in June 1976 he saw "the PLO in open combat within West Beirut against As-Saiqa, who had attacked Arafat's forces on orders from Damascus."

Assassination
Mohsen was killed by gunshots to his head as he left a casino in Cannes on 27 July 1979 and walked towards the apartment. Although the attack was blamed by various sources on Mossad, Palestinians and Egypt, the gunmen were at first not identified. In 2018, Ronen Bergman wrote that it was the first  assassination by a new Israeli combat union, called "The New Bayonet". “According to Bergman;  "The Mossad marked the hit down as a success."
Both Yasir Arafat and Hafez al-Assad attended his funeral in Damascus on 29 July. He was initially succeeded as leader of As-Sa'iqa by Sami Attari.

Notes

References
  Thomas L. Friedman, From Beirut to Jerusalem (HarperCollins Publishers, 1998, 2nd ed.), p. 118

External links

1973 interview with Mohsen (including photograph)

1936 births
1979 deaths
Assassinated Palestinian people
Assassinated Palestinian politicians
Members of the Jordanian Regional Branch of the Ba'ath Party
Members of the National Command of the Ba'ath Party (Syrian-dominated faction)
Palestine Liberation Organization members
Palestinian Arab nationalists
Palestinian people murdered abroad
Palestinian refugees
People from Tulkarm
People killed in Mossad operations
People murdered in France
Members of the Executive Committee of the Palestine Liberation Organization
Members of the Palestinian Central Council
Members of the Palestinian National Council